Colasposoma sellatum is a species of leaf beetle from Australia and Papua New Guinea, described by Joseph Sugar Baly in 1878. In Australia, it is found around Darwin in the Northern Territory, in the north-east of Queensland and on the Torres Strait Islands. It is the only member of the genus Colasposoma found in Australia, where it is known as a pest of sweet potatoes.

Description
Adults are between 6.2 and 9.2 mm in length, and are strongly metallic in appearance. They are generally coloured green or blue, rarely coppery or purple, though they frequently have a different colour along the elytral suture or lateral margins. Larvae are white, with a body length of approximately 1.5 mm in the first instar, to approximately 12.0 mm in the fifth instar.

References

sellatum
Beetles of Australia
Beetles of Papua New Guinea
Taxa named by Joseph Sugar Baly
Beetles described in 1878
Agricultural pest insects